Once Bitten was Annabel Lamb's 1983 debut album. The U.S. version of the album differed from the U.K. release and as well as different cover artwork, contained the single "Riders on the Storm" which was not present on the original U.K. issue.

Track listing
All tracks composed by Annabel Lamb; except where indicated
 "Once Bitten"
 "Take Me in Your Arms"
 "Heartland" (Adrian Borland)
 "Hold Fast"
 "Backwards Through the Looking Glass"
 "Dividing the Spoils of Love" (Lamb, Mark Damron)
 "Red for Danger"
 "Snake Pliskin"
 "Missing"
 "No Cure"

Personnel
Annabel Lamb - lead vocals, backing vocals, synthesizer, piano, Hammond organ
Chris Jarrett - guitar
Steve Greetham - bass, fretless bass, guitar, backing vocals
Robin Langridge - piano, synthesizer, Hammond organ, backing vocals
Richie Stevens - drums, percussion
John Kongos - Fairlight CMI
Jim Dvořák - trumpet
Adrian Borland - guitar on "Heartland"
Steve Hogarth - piano on "Dividing the Spoils of Love"
Colin Woore - additional guitar on "Hold Fast"
Jeff Scantlebury - congas on "Missing"
Paul Hirsh - panpipes on "No Cure"

1983 debut albums
Annabel Lamb albums
A&M Records albums